Tõnis Kalbus (also Tõnu Kalbus; 5 December 1880, Tori Parish – 20 March 1942 Sosva, Sverdlovsk Oblast, Russian SFSR) was an Estonian lawyer and politician.

From 1925 to 1926 he was Minister of Justice. From 1928 to 1930 he was Minister of Justice and Minister of Internal Affairs.

Following the Soviet occupation of Estonia in 1940, Kalbus was arrested by the NKVD and deported to Sverdlovsk Oblast and died  Sosva gulag camp.

References

1880 births
1942 deaths
People from Tori Parish
People from Kreis Pernau
Estonian Labour Party politicians
National Centre Party (Estonia) politicians
Government ministers of Estonia
Justice ministers of Estonia
Members of the Estonian Constituent Assembly
Members of the Riigikogu, 1920–1923
Members of the Riigikogu, 1923–1926
Members of the Riigikogu, 1926–1929
Members of the Riigikogu, 1929–1932
Members of the Riigikogu, 1932–1934
20th-century Estonian lawyers
People who died in the Gulag
Estonian people who died in Soviet detention